Stephan Mensah (born 1 June 2000) is a German footballer who plays as a left winger for Regionalliga Nordost club Chemnitzer FC.

Career
Born in Karlsruhe, Mensah started his career at Karlsruher SC, before signing for SpVgg Unterhaching on a three-year contract in June 2019. He made his debut for Unterhaching on 26 October 2019, coming on as a second-half substite for Schröter in a 0–0 draw at home to FSV Zwickau. On 31 January 2020, Mensah joined TSV 1860 Rosenheim on loan until the end of the season.

Mensah returned to Rosenheim on a permanent deal in January 2022.

On 20 July 2022, Mensah signed a two-year contract with Regionalliga Nordost club Chemnitzer FC.

References

External links
 
 

Living people
2000 births
Footballers from Karlsruhe
Association football midfielders
German footballers
TSV 1860 Rosenheim players
SpVgg Unterhaching players
Chemnitzer FC players
3. Liga players
Regionalliga players
German sportspeople of Ghanaian descent